Zainab Afailal (in Arabic: زينب أفيلال, Tetuan, 31 October 1990) is a Moroccan Andalusian Music singer.

Born in 1990 in Tetuan, she grew up with an apparent interest in music, as she started to learn partitions and sing them by the age of four. She started her musical education at the conservatory of her hometown (Tetuan) under the guidance of professor Mohamed Amin Al Akrami. Later she became the lead voice of the Andalusian Music Group of Tetuan, something rare for a Moroccan woman.

Zainab Afailal participated with Tetuan's Andalusian group in various concerts and festivals both inside and outside Morocco. She has also participated in a number of films, mainly documentaries on Andalusian Music.

Currently, and in parallel with her career, Zainab pursues her university studies at the University of Zaragoza (Spain), where she is working on her doctoral thesis in industrial chemistry.

References

1990 births
Living people
21st-century Moroccan women singers
University of Zaragoza alumni
Moroccan expatriates in Spain